Mikhail Sergeyevich Gelfand (born 25 October 1963) is a Russian Bioinformaticist and molecular biologist. He is a member of Academia Europaea, Vice President Biomedical Research of Skolkovo Institute of Science and Technology, one of the founder of Dissernet plagiarism fighting society and a political activist, former member of Russian Opposition Coordination Council. He is a grandson of a prominent Soviet mathematician Israel Gelfand.

Some works by Mikhail Gelfand 

 Gelfand M. S. Statistical analysis of mammalian pre-mRNA splicing sites // Nucleic Acids Research. 1989. V. 17. N. 15. 6369—6382.
 Gelfand M. S. Computer prediction of the exon-intron structure of mammalian pre-mRNAs // Nucleic Acids Research. 1990. Y. 18. N. 19. P. 5865—5869.
 Gelfand M. S. Statistical analysis and prediction of the exonic structure of human genes // Journal of Molecular Evolution. 1992. Y. 35. N. 2. P. 239—252.
 Gelfand M. S. Genetic language: metaphore or analogy // BioSystems. 1993. V. 30. P. 277—288
 Pevzner Р. А., Gelfand M. S., eds. Computer Genetics. A special issue on computational molecular biology // BioSystems. 1993. V. 30.
 Gelfand M. S., Mironov A. A., Pevzner P. A. Spliced alignment: a new approach to gene recognition // Lecture Notes in Computer Science. 1996. V. 1075. P. 141—158.
 Gelfand M. S., Mironov A. A., Pevzner P. A. Gene recognition via spliced sequence alignment // Proceedings of the National Academy of Sciences. 1996. V. 93. P. 9061-9066.
 Gelfand M. S., Koonin E. V. Avoidance of palindromic words in bacterial and archaeal genomes: a close connection with restriction enzymes // Nucleic Acids Research. 1997. V. 27. P. 2430—2439.
 Sze S.-H, Roytberg М. А., Gelfand M. S., Mironov A. A., Astakhova T. V., Pevzner P. A. Algorithms and software for support of gene identification experiments // Bioinformatics
 Mironov A. A., Roytberg M. A., Pevzner P. A., Gelfand M. S. Performance guarantee gene predictions via spliced alignment // Genomics

Awards and honors
In 2022, Gelfand was elected as a Fellow of the International Society for Computational Biology.

References

External links
Gelfand publications on Зubmed
Popular science videos by Gelfand on Youtube

Russian bioinformaticians
Russian geneticists
Molecular biologists
Russian activists
1963 births
Living people
Russian activists against the 2022 Russian invasion of Ukraine
Moscow State University alumni
Members of Academia Europaea
Academic staff of the Higher School of Economics
Academic staff of Moscow State University
Science communicators